Norape plumosa is a moth of the Megalopygidae family. It was described by Arthur Gardiner Butler in 1877. It is found in Costa Rica, Panama and the Amazon region.

Adults are similar to Norape walkeri.

Subspecies
Norape plumosa plumosa (Brazil)
Norape plumosa angustior Hopp, 1927 (Brazil)
Norape plumosa biacuta Hopp, 1927 (Colombia)

References

Moths described in 1877
Megalopygidae